Olga Petrovna Sosina (born 27 July 1992) is a Russian ice hockey forward and captain of the Russian national ice hockey team, currently serving as alternate captain of Agidel Ufa in the Zhenskaya Hockey League (ZhHL). She won bronze medals at the World Championships in 2013 and 2016. Sosina has played in the women's ice hockey tournament at three Olympic Games, first in 2010.

International career
Sosina was selected for the Russian national ice hockey team at the Winter Olympics in 2010 and 2014. At the 2010 Olympics in Vancouver, she played in all five games but did not record any points. At the 2014 Olympics in Sochi, she played in all six games, recording four points (3 goals, 1 assist). Sosina served as captain of the Olympic Athletes from Russia team in the women's ice hockey tournament at the 2018 Winter Olympics. 

Sosina has also represented Russia at eight IIHF Women's World Championships. Her first appearance came in 2009. She was a member of the bronze medal winning teams at the 2013 and 2016 IIHF Women's World Championships.

She also competed in three junior tournaments for the Russia women's national under-18 ice hockey team, with her first the inaugural event in 2008.

Career statistics

International career

Sources:

References

External links

1992 births
Living people
Ice hockey players at the 2010 Winter Olympics
Ice hockey players at the 2014 Winter Olympics
Ice hockey players at the 2018 Winter Olympics
Olympic ice hockey players of Russia
Russian women's ice hockey forwards
Sportspeople from Kazan
Universiade medalists in ice hockey
Universiade gold medalists for Russia
Competitors at the 2015 Winter Universiade
Competitors at the 2017 Winter Universiade
Ice hockey players at the 2022 Winter Olympics